George Ghica (3 March 1600 – 2 November 1664) founder of the Ghica family, was Prince of Moldavia in 1658–1659 and Prince of Wallachia in 1659–1660.

George Ghica was born in Köprülü, present day Veles, to Albanian parents. At a young age, Ghica was involved in trading and dealings with merchandise. George, along with his father expanded their business and moved to Moldavia. Accumulating a substantial amount of wealth, George became a nobleman and was sent to the Sublime Porte as an ambassador. He was in favour with Vasile Lupu in Moldavia and while in Istanbul, he became close friends with the Grand Vizier Köprülü Mehmed Pasha and helped him on to high positions. As Prince of Wallachia he moved the capital from Târgoviște to Bucharest.

From him are descended the numerous branches of the family which became notable in the history of Moldavia and Wallachia. His son was Grigore I Ghica.

References

Bibliography 

Ghica, Gheorghe I
Ghica, Gheorghe I
Ghica family
Ghica, Gheorghe
Ghica, Gheorghe I
Rulers of Moldavia and Wallachia
Romanian people of Albanian descent